A list of films produced in Hong Kong in 1996:.

1996

References

External links
 IMDB list of Hong Kong films
 Hong Kong films of 1996 at HKcinemamagic.com

1996
Hong Kong
1996 in Hong Kong